The following list includes notable people who were born or have lived in Columbus, Georgia.

Phillip Wheeler
Columbus, Ga
Shaw High School-Columbus
Georgia Institute of Technology- Linebacker
Multi Year NFL-Linebacker
Drafted by Raiders

Arts and culture

Music

Business

Military 
{| class="wikitable sortable"
|-
! scope="col" width="140" |Name
! scope="col" width="80" class="unsortable" | Image
! scope="col" width="90" |Birth
! scope="col" width="90" |Death
! scope="col" width="600" class="unsortable"  |Known for
! scope="col" width="200" class="unsortable"  |Association
! scope="col" width="30" class="unsortable"  |Reference
|-
| 
| 
| align=right| 
| align=right| 
| Judge on the Georgia Supreme Court; Confederate Army general; namesake of Fort Benning
| Born and died in Columbus
| align="center"|
|-
| 
| 
| align=right| 
| align=right| 
| First African-American military pilot
| Born in Columbus
| align="center"|
|-
| 
| 
| align=right| 
| align=right| 
| United States Army officer convicted of ordering the My Lai Massacre
| Lived in Columbus
|-
|}

Politics

Sports

Baseball

Basketball

Bodybuilding

Football

Soccer

Wrestling

References

Columbus
Columbus